Zakaria Gwandu Namonge is a Tanzanian Olympic middle-distance runner. He represented his country in the men's 1500 meters at the 1984 Summer Olympics. His time was a 3:45.55 in the first heat.

References 

1964 births
Living people
Tanzanian male middle-distance runners
Olympic athletes of Tanzania
Athletes (track and field) at the 1984 Summer Olympics